This is a list of the U.S. Billboard magazine Hot 100 number-one singles of 1986. The longest running number-one singles of 1986 are "That's What Friends Are For" by Dionne and Friends and "Walk Like an Egyptian" by The Bangles, which each logged four weeks at number-one. "Walk Like an Egyptian" logged two weeks at number-one in 1986 and two more weeks at number-one in 1987, summing up to four weeks at the top. "Say You, Say Me" by Lionel Richie concluded another four week run that began in 1985. 1986 is the year with the third largest number of number-one songs, with 30 songs reaching the #1 spot.

That year, 20 acts earned their first number one song, such as Heart, Falco, Robert Palmer, Pet Shop Boys, Simply Red, Genesis, Peter Gabriel, Steve Winwood, Bananarama, Berlin, Janet Jackson, Boston, Bon Jovi, Amy Grant, Bruce Hornsby & the Range, and The Bangles. Gladys Knight, Patti LaBelle, Michael McDonald, and Peter Cetera, already having hit number one with Gladys Knight & the Pips, Labelle, The Doobie Brothers, and Chicago, respectively, also earn their first number one songs as solo acts. Whitney Houston, Madonna, and Peter Cetera were the only acts to earn more than one number one song, with each of them hitting the top twice.

Chart history

Number-one artists

See also
1986 in music
List of Billboard number-one singles
Cashbox Top 100 number-one singles of 1986 by Cash Box

References

Additional sources
Fred Bronson's Billboard Book of Number 1 Hits, 5th Edition
Joel Whitburn's Top Pop Singles 1955-2008, 12 Edition
Joel Whitburn Presents the Billboard Hot 100 Charts: The Eighties
Additional information obtained can be verified within Billboards online archive services and print editions of the magazine.

United States Hot 100
1986